USL Pro Iowa is a proposed American professional soccer club located in Des Moines, Iowa. The club is planned to debut in the USL Championship in 2025. The team will play its games in a brand-new soccer-specific stadium.

Despite initially announcing plans for the stadium in 2019 with a 2022 start date, as of late 2022 the team had been delayed and the team was still seeking stadium funding, causing some to question if the project was still active.

References

External links

Soccer clubs in Iowa
Sports in Des Moines, Iowa
USL Championship teams